Lutz is a surname and given name. It may also refer to:

Places
Lütz, a municipality in Rhineland-Palatinate, Germany
Lutz, Florida, an unincorporated census-designated place in the United States
Lutz Hill, a hill in the Kyle Hills, Ross Island, Antarctica

Other uses 
 Lutz jump, a figure skating jump
 Lutz Children's Museum, museum in Manchester, Connecticut, founded 1953
 Lutz, a fictional place in the 2014 film The Grand Budapest Hotel

See also
Baggersee Lutz, a lake in Baden-Württemberg, Germany